This article lists Fellows of the Royal Society who were elected in 2020.

Fellows

 Timothy Behrens 
 Yoshua Bengio 
 Malcolm J. Bennett
 Ben Berks FRS, University of Oxford
 Zulfiqar Bhutta
 Kevin Brindle
 Gordon Brown FMedSci FRS, University of Exeter
 William C. Campbell
 Henry N. Chapman
 G. Marius Clore
 Vikram Deshpande
 John Endler
 Adam Eyre-Walker
 Daniel Frost
 François Guillemot
 David Harel
 Marian Holness
 Ehud Hrushovski
  FRS, University of Edinburgh
 George Jackson
 Xin Lu
 Alexander Makarov
 Keith Matthews
 Iain McCulloch
 Linda Nazar
 Peter Nellist
 Giles Oldroyd
 Hugh Osborn
 Oliver Phillips
 Raymond Pierrehumbert
 John Plane
 Cathy J. Price
 Carol Prives
 Didier Queloz 
 Nicholas Read
 Michael Rudnicki
 William Schafer
 Nigel Scrutton
 John Shine 
 Stephen Smartt
 Ralf Speth
 Molly Stevens 
 Donna Strickland
 Andrew M. Stuart
 Sarah Teichmann 
 Richard Thompson
 Jack Thorne
 Nicholas Turner
 Jane Visvader
 Alan M. Wilson FRS, Royal Veterinary College
 Steve Young

Honorary Fellows

 David Cooksey

Foreign Members

 Frances Arnold ForMemRS 
 Francis Collins ForMemRS
 Kerry Emanuel ForMemRS 
 Ben Feringa ForMemRS 
 Else Marie Friis ForMemRS 
 Regine Kahmann ForMemRS 
 Margaret Kivelson ForMemRS 
 Ramamoorthy Ramesh ForMemRS 
 Wendelin Werner ForMemRS 
 Ada Yonath ForMemRS

References

2020
2020 in the United Kingdom
2020 in science